Ma Liang  may refer to:

People
Ma Liang (Three Kingdoms) (186–222), advisor to the warlord Liu Bei during the Three Kingdoms period
Ma Xiangbo (1840–1939), also called Ma Liang, educator and scholar
Ma Liang (general), general of the National Revolutionary Army
Ma Liang (footballer) (born 1982), Chinese football player

Fictional characters
"Bomei" Ma Liang, character in the Chinese comic Ying Xiong Wu Lei
 The main character of the Chinese fairy tale Ma Liang and the Magic Brush (Chinese: 神笔马良)